The Carr Baronetcy, of Sleaford in the County of Lincolnshire, is a title in the Baronetage of England. It was created on 29 June 1611 for Edward Carr who was Sheriff of Lincolnshire in 1614. The 3rd Baronet was Member of Parliament for Lincolnshire in the House of Commons.

Carr baronets, of Sleaford (1611)
Sir Edward Carr, 1st Baronet (died 1618), married (1) Catherine Bolle, (2) (Lucy) Anne Dyer (d. 1639).
Sir Robert Carr, 2nd Baronet ( – 1667), married Mary Gargrave daughter of Sir Richard Gargrave of Kingsley and Nostell.
Sir Robert Carr, 3rd Baronet (c. 1637 – 1682)
Sir Edward Carr, 4th Baronet (c. 1665 – 1683)
Sir Rochester Carr, 5th Baronet (c. 1617 – 1695) (Title extinct on his death)

References

Debrett's Baronetage of England 7th Edition (1839) pp12–13 Google Books
Kidd, Charles & Williamson, David (editors). Debrett's Peerage and Baronetage (1990 edition). New York: St Martin's Press, 1990.

Further reading 
 "Family of Carre or Carr of Sleaford" in George W. Marshal (ed.), The Genealogist, volume 3, pp. 193–206. 1879. London: George Bell and Sons.
 G. E. Cokayne, Complete Baronetage, vol. 1. 1900. Exeter: William Pollard & Co. Ltd.
 J. S. Crossette, "Carr, Sir Robert (c.1637-82), of Aswarby, Lincs." in B. D. Henning (ed.), The History of Parliament: the House of Commons, 1660-1690. 1983.
 J. S. Crossette, "Lincolnshire" in B. D. Henning (ed.), The History of Parliament: the House of Commons, 1660-1690. 1983.
 Sheila M. Elsdon, Old Sleaford Revealed. 1997. Oxbow Books.
 N. M. Fuidge, "Carr, Robert (c. 1511-90), of Sleaford, Lincs." in P. W. Hasler (ed.), The History of Parliament: The House of Commons, 1558–1603. 1981.
 Rev. Canon A. R. Maddison, Lincolnshire Pedigrees, vol. 1 (The Publications of the Harliean Society, vol. 50). 1902. London: Harleian Society.
 Maurice P. Moore, Family of Carre of Sleford, co. of Lincoln. 1863. Sleaford: William Fawcett.
 Simon Pawley, The Book of Sleaford. 1996. Baron Birch for Quotes Ltd.
 Edward Trollope, Sleaford and the Wapentakes of Flaxwell and Ashwardhurn. 1872. London: W. Kent & Co.

 

Carr
1611 establishments in England